The Outspan Hotel is in Nyeri, Kenya. It was built up from an old farm by Eric Sherbrooke Walker in the 1920s. 

Walker had purchased  of Crown Land in Nyeri and in 1928, opened the Outspan Hotel, overlooking the gorge of a river in the Aberdare Range.

Background
In 1939, Baden-Powell and his wife Olave moved to a cottage he had commissioned on the grounds of the hotel.  The Paxtu cottage is integrated into the hotel buildings and serves as a small Scouting museum.

The hunter Jim Corbett also lived there.

See also
Treetops Hotel

References 

Hotels in Kenya
Hotels established in 1928
Hotel buildings completed in 1928